Marcin Łukaszewski (born March 15, 1978 in Bydgoszcz) is a Polish former professional footballer who last played for Zawisza Bydgoszcz. In 2011 he suffered a career-ending injury.

References

External links
 
 

1978 births
Living people
Polish footballers
Zawisza Bydgoszcz players
Dyskobolia Grodzisk Wielkopolski players
Świt Nowy Dwór Mazowiecki players
Obra Kościan players
Airdrieonians F.C. players
Sportspeople from Bydgoszcz
Association football defenders
Polish expatriate footballers
Expatriate footballers in Scotland
Polish expatriate sportspeople in Scotland